Ger Reddin (born 14 January 1988 in Castletown, County Laois, Ireland) is an Irish sportsperson.  He plays hurling with his local club Castletown and has been a member of the Laois senior inter-county team since 2011.

References

1988 births
Living people
Laois inter-county hurlers
Castletown hurlers